Psoralea corylifolia (babchi) is a plant used in Indian and Chinese traditional medicine. The seeds of this plant contain a variety of coumarins, including psoralen.

Etymology
Psoralea is from the Greek psoraleos meaning 'scabby', and refers to small glands covering the plant. Corylifolia comes from similarity of the leaves to those of Corylus, a genus of tree in northern world regions, such as Sweden.

Description
Psoralea corylifolia grows 50–90 cm tall and is an annual plant.  It has pale-purple flowers in short, condensed, axillary spikes. Its corolla is pale purple. Flowers one-seeded fruits.  The most distinctive feature is the occurrence of minute brown glands which are immersed in surface tissue on all parts of the plant, giving it a distinctive and pleasant fragrance.

Habitat and distribution
Psoralea corylifolia is native to India and Sri Lanka, and was occasionally cultivated in Arabia for its supposed medicinal properties.

Chemical constituents
Psoralea corylifolia extract contains numerous phytochemicals, including flavonoids (neobavaisoflavone, isobavachalcone, bavachalcone, bavachinin, bavachin, corylin, corylifol, corylifolin and 6-prenylnaringenin), coumarins (psoralidin, psoralen, isopsoralen and angelicin), meroterpenes (bakuchiol, and 3-hydroxybakuchiol).

Use in traditional medicine
Psoralea corylifolia, or bu gu zhi in traditional Chinese medicine, is a herb used as a supposed therapy for several disorders having limited clinical evidence, such as treatment of [lichen planus] by psoralen extract combined with sunlight exposure.

References

Psoraleeae
Tumbleweeds
Norepinephrine–dopamine reuptake inhibitors
Plants described in 1753
Taxa named by Carl Linnaeus